Gomi may refer to:
 Gomi (surname)
 7035 Gomi, a main-belt asteroid
 Gomi (comics), code name of Alphonsus Lefszycic, a fictional character in the Marvel Comics Universe
 Gomi, Japanese for trash, and the name of an art movement that uses trash